Fredonia High School is a public secondary school in Fredonia, Kansas, United States. It is the sole high school operated by Fredonia USD 484 school district, as well as Fredonia Middle School and Lincoln Elementary.

References

Public high schools in Kansas
Schools in Wilson County, Kansas